Sir Walter Devereux, 5th Viscount Hereford, 2nd Baronet of Castle Bromwich (c. 1575 – 1656), was an English politician who sat in the House of Commons at various times, between 1614 and 1624, before succeeding to the family Viscountcy in the peerage of England.

Life 

The son of Sir Edward Devereux, of Castle Bromwich, Warwickshire, and his wife Catherine née Arden, he was grandson of Sir Walter Devereux, cr. Viscount Hereford in 1550. He succeeded his father in 1622 as 2nd baronet, later inheriting in 1646 the title of his first cousin twice removed as Viscount Hereford.

Devereux previously served as Member of Parliament (MP) for Stafford in 1614, before being elected in 1621 as MP for Marlborough, and in 1624 as MP for Worcestershire then in 1625 MP for Worcester. He also served as High Sheriff of Worcestershire in 1625.

When Robert Devereux, 3rd Earl of Essex died in 1646, Sir Walter succeeded as 5th Viscount Hereford, but not to his earldom to which he was not in remainder and which became extinct. Lord Hereford was appointed as Lord Lieutenant of Monmouthshire in 1646 and became a member of the Radnorshire Militia Committee in 1648.

Family 
Devereux married twice, firstly, Elizabeth Baspole, daughter of Robert Baspole and secondly, Elizabeth Knightley, daughter of Thomas Knightley. With the latter he had three sons:
Essex Devereux (1615–1639) who married Anne daughter of Sir William Courteen and Anne Tryon but drowned while boating leaving one daughter, Elizabeth. Anne married secondly Sir Richard Knightley;
Leicester Devereux, 6th Viscount Hereford who succeeded him, and;
Walter Devereux (1621–1683), MP for Orford.

See also 
 Devereux baronets
 Earl of Essex

References

External links
 Burke's Landed Gentry : ARDEN of Park Hall
 

 

1570s births
1658 deaths
Walter 5
Walter
Members of the Parliament of England for Worcestershire
16th-century English nobility
High Sheriffs of Worcestershire
English MPs 1614
English MPs 1621–1622
English MPs 1624–1625